Roda is a Greek village mainly designed for summertime tourism. The village becomes almost a ghost town in the winter.

The village is at the centre of the north coast of the Greek island of Corfu. It normally opens up in May and closes down for winter around October.

A part of Roda beach is awarded with the blue flag.

References 

Populated places in Corfu (regional unit)
Beaches of Greece
Seaside resorts in Greece